The Minister of Education is a cabinet minister in the province of Manitoba, Canada.  The department's primary responsibility is oversight of Manitoba's public school system.

The Department of Education is one of Manitoba's oldest government departments, although its specific designation has changed several times.  It was known as the Minister of Youth and Education from 1968 to 1971, before returning to its original name.  On April 21, 1989, it was retitled as the Minister of Education and Training.  It was further restructured as the Minister of Education, Training and Youth in 2001, the Minister of Education and Youth in 2002, the Minister of Education, Citizenship and Youth in 2003, and back to the Minister of Education in 2009.

Responsibility for Training was moved to the Ministry of Advanced Education and Training in 2001, and to the Ministry of Competitiveness, Training and Trade in 2006 (renamed the Ministry of Entrepreneurship, Training and Trade in 2010).  On May 3, 2016 the Pallister government returned the training portion of the ministry back to education under the name Education and Training.

The current Minister of Education and Early Childhood Learning is Wayne Ewasko.

List of Ministers of Education

References

Education, Minister of
Education in Manitoba
Education ministries